Sunan Sitijenar is, according to the Babad Tanah Jawi ("History of the land of Java") manuscripts, one of the Wali Sanga ("Nine Saints") to whom Indonesian legend attributes the propagation of Islam among the Javanese, Indonesia's largest ethnic group.

However, some Javanese texts relate stories about Syekh Siti Jenar (also known as Syekh Lemah Abang) having conflicts with the Wali Sanga and the Sultanate of Demak.

See also

Islam in Indonesia
The spread of Islam in Indonesia

References

Sources

Published sources

 
 
 

History of Islam in Indonesia
Wali Sanga